In mathematics, a pro-simplicial set is an inverse system of simplicial sets.

A pro-simplicial set is called pro-finite if each term of the inverse system of simplicial sets has finite homotopy groups.

Pro-simplicial sets show up in shape theory, in the study of localization and completion in homotopy theory, and in the study of homotopy properties of schemes (e.g. étale homotopy theory).

References
.
.

Simplicial sets